The Trumpchi GA4 is a compact sedan produced by GAC Group under the Trumpchi brand in China and the GAC Motor brand globally. It was intended to be a smaller successor to the GA5 compact sedan, leaving the GA5 nameplate open for a new compact sedan model.

Overview

The Trumpchi GA4 was officially launched during the 2018 North American International Auto Show in Detroit as the replacement for the Trumpchi GA5 compact sedan in China, and it went on sale in China shortly after on January 18, 2018. Sales in North America was planned to start in 2019.

The GA4 sedan is powered by either a 1.5-liter I4 with 114hp mated to a 5-speed manual or a 4-speed automatic transmission, or a 1.3-liter turbo I4 engine generating 137hp and 202Nm of torque, mated to a 5-speed manual or a 6-speed automatic transmission. Prices ranges from 73,800 Yuan (€ 9,400/ US$11,600) to 115,800 Yuan (€ 14,800/ US$18,300).

Motorsport
On June 12, 2019, a GAC GA4 topped the Manufacturer Class of both four-hour and 12-hour segments of the Kalayaan Cup Endurance Challenge at Clark International Speedway in the Philippines. In GAC Motor's debut at the endurance race, the car finished second overall in the first four hours, and fourth overall in the entire 12-hour race.

See also
 List of GAC vehicles

References

External links

 
 (Global)

GA4
Cars introduced in 2018
Compact cars
Cars of China
Front-wheel-drive vehicles